Alberto Carneroli (born 30 July 1959) is a former Italian sport shooter who won medals at senior level at the European Championships.

Career
Angelantoni won three medals in World Cup. He has also obtained nine international medals, at the world championships and at the European championships, in the universal trench, discipline of shooting other than trap (Olympic trenc) and for this reason not under the aegis of the International Shooting Sport Federation (ISSF) but of the Fédération Internationale de Tir aux Armes Sportives de Chasse (FITASC).

Honours
 CONI: Golden Collar of Sports Merit: Collare d'Oro al Merito Sportivo

See also
Trap World Champions
Trap European Champions

References

External links
 

1971 births
Living people
Trap and double trap shooters
Italian male sport shooters
People from Todi
Sportspeople from the Province of Perugia